The Lyres of Ur or Harps of Ur are a group of four stringed instruments excavated in a fragmentary condition at the Royal Cemetery of Ur in modern Iraq from 1922 onwards.  They date back to the Early Dynastic III Period of Mesopotamia, between about 2550 and 2450 BC, making them the world's oldest surviving stringed instruments. Carefully restored and reconstructed, they are now divided between museums in Iraq, the United Kingdom and the United States. 

Strictly speaking, three lyres and one harp were discovered, but all are often called lyres. The instrument remains were restored and distributed between the museums that took part in the digs. The "Golden Lyre of Ur" or "Bull's Lyre", the finest, is in the Iraq Museum in Baghdad. The British Museum in London has the "Queen's Lyre" and "Silver Lyre", and the Penn Museum in Philadelphia has the "Bull Headed Lyre".

In 1929, archaeologists led by the British archaeologist Leonard Woolley, representing a joint expedition of the British Museum and the University of Pennsylvania Museum of Archaeology and Anthropology, discovered the instruments while excavating the Royal Cemetery at Ur. They discovered pieces of three lyres and one harp in Ur, located in what was Ancient Mesopotamia and is contemporary Iraq. They are over 4,500 years old, from ancient Mesopotamia during the Early Dynastic III Period (2550–2450 BC). The decorations on the lyres are fine examples of the court art of Mesopotamia of the period.

Leonard Woolley discovered the lyres amongst the bodies of ten women in the Royal Cemetery at Ur. One body was even said to be lying against the lyre with her skeletal hand placed where the strings would have been. Upon this discovery, Woolley was quick to pour in a liquid plaster to recover the delicate form of the wooden frame. The wood of the lyres was decayed but since some were covered in nonperishable materials, like gold and silver, they were able to be recovered.

Lyres 
A lyre is a musical instrument that is stringed and has a role projecting from the body. There are two types of lyres: box and bowl. Like their names suggest, the box lyres have a boxlike body and the bowl lyres have a round body with a curved back. The Lyres of Ur are box lyres. They were played in an upright position with the strings plucked with both hands.

Because of how they were discovered it is believed that the lyres were used in burial ceremonies in accompaniment to songs. Each lyre has 11 strings to play on that would produce a buzzing noise that repeated throughout the song. The musician playing the instrument would repeat the pattern displayed on the lyre.

The four lyres
The "Golden Lyre of Ur" or "Bull's Lyre" is the finest lyre, and was given to the Iraq Museum in Baghdad. Its reconstructed wooden body was damaged due to flooding during the second Iraqi War; a replica of it is being played as part of a touring ensemble. The "Golden Lyre" got its name because the whole head of the bull is made of gold. The eyes are made of inlaid nacre and lapis lazuli. The beard is similar in appearance to the "Great Lyre" and the "Queen's Lyre". The body of the bull was originally wood but did not survive. Its discoverer, Woolley, believed that unlike the other lyres, the body of the "Golden Lyre" would have originally had legs.

The "Queen's Lyre" is one of two that Woolley found in the grave of Queen Pu-abi. The mask of the bull is gold. The eyes, hair, and beard are all made of lapis lazuli and the horns are modern. The shape of the lyre is meant to resemble a bull's body. A noticeable difference between the "Great Lyre" and the "Queens Lyre" is that the "Great Lyre" has a straight forehead where the "Queen's Lyre" curves slightly around the brow bone. It is held in the British Museum.

The "Bull Headed Lyre" is 40 cm in height, 11 cm in width, and 19 cm in depth. The shape of the lyre is meant to resemble a bull's body. Its head, face and horns are all wrapped in gold foil while its hair, beard, and eyes are made of lapis lazuli. Below the head is a front panel made of shell inlay set into bitumen. This panel depicts a figure holding onto a bull's horns above, and animals acting as humans below. The bull head itself likely represents the sun god Utu, who was thought to be able to descend into the underworld. The lyre is held in the Penn Museum in Philadelphia. 

It is one of two silver lyres discovered in "The Great Death Pit". Both lyres were made of wood and then covered in sheets of silver that were attached with small silver nails. The eyes are made of lapis lazuli and the lyre was also trimmed with narrow borders of lapis lazuli. This is the only lyre that is not bearded. Because of this fresh face some believe it is actually a cow rather than a bull. It is held by the British Museum.

The Penn Museum also holds a silver boat-shaped Lyre.

Gallery

See also
Music of ancient Mesopotamia
Ninigizibara
1929 in archaeology
Kinnor, ancient Hebrew form of a lyre or kithara
Nevel, ancient Hebrew form of a harp or nabla

References

3rd-millennium BC works
1929 archaeological discoveries
Ancient music
Archaeological discoveries in Iraq
Individual harps
Middle Eastern objects in the British Museum
Objects in the National Museum of Iraq
Ur
Sculpture of the Ancient Near East
Early Dynastic Period (Mesopotamia)